The following is a list of the television networks and announcers who have broadcast college football's New Mexico Bowl throughout the years.

Television

Radio

References

New Mexico
Broadcasters
New Mexico
New Mexico
New Mexico
New Mexico sports-related lists